Anitra Necole "Nikki" Blue (born March 29, 1984) is an American professional basketball assistant coach for the Phoenix Mercury.

High school
Born and raised in Bakersfield, California, Blue played her high school career at West High School.  Blue set the CIF Central Section record for points scored in a single season (913 in the 2000–01 season) and career (2,934 points).  Blue averaged 29 points per game her senior year at West and lead Kern County in assist per game as well.  Blue is regarded as the best player to ever come out of the CIF Central Section.  However, due to the lack of talent around her, West High never won a section championship during Blue's career.  The closest West came was in 2002 when West lost to crosstown rival Stockdale 82–55 in the CIF Central Section Division II championship game. Blue was named a WBCA All-American. She participated in the 2001 WBCA High School All-America Game, where she scored two points.

College
Blue was regarded as one of the best point guards in the country, and was offered a full-ride scholarship to the University of Connecticut, the nations top ranked team in 2002.  However, Blue turned the offer down and instead opted to go to UCLA, which went 10–20 during the 2002 season.  Blue stated that UCLA was closer to home and she liked the idea of rebuilding a program.

At UCLA, Blue was a four-year starting point guard.  She was named first-team All-Pacific-10 Conference and to the All-Freshmen team.  She averaged 16.6 points per game, 5.5 rebounds per game, 3.6 assist per game, and 2.7 steals per game her freshman year. 
As a sophomore, she was named first-team All-Pac-10 for the second straight year. As a junior, she joined Ann Meyers as the second Bruin to record over 1,300 points and 400 assists. She was one of the finalists for the Nancy Lieberman Award her senior year. Her career averages at UCLA were 15.2 points per game, 5.1 assist per game, 5.2 rebounds per game, and 2.8 steals per game.

UCLA statistics
Source

Professional
After her college career, Blue was selected in the second round of the 2006 WNBA Draft by the Washington Mystics. She played 4 seasons with the Mystics before being traded on May 13, 2010 to the New York Liberty in exchange for rookie Ashley Houts.

Career Totals

Personal
Her full name is Anitra Necole Blue. She is the daughter to Sabrina Hunter and has one brother, Andre. She has served as an assistant coach in the UNLV women's basketball program for the past two years during her off-season from the WNBA. Her biggest thrill to date was being selected to play in the first McDonald's All-Star game in New York. She also lettered in volleyball (three years), softball (one year) and track and field (one year). She majored in history at UCLA.

Notes

External links
 Cal State Bakersfield coaching bio
 Profile WNBA.com
 UCLA bio

1984 births
Living people
American expatriate basketball people in Greece
American expatriate basketball people in Turkey
American women's basketball players
American women's basketball coaches
Basketball players from Bakersfield, California
Cal State Bakersfield Roadrunners women's basketball coaches
McDonald's High School All-Americans
New York Liberty players
Parade High School All-Americans (girls' basketball)
Phoenix Mercury coaches
Point guards
UCLA Bruins women's basketball players
UNLV Lady Rebels basketball coaches
Washington Mystics draft picks
Washington Mystics players